Haring is a surname of Austrian origin. Notable people with the surname include:

 Inez M. Haring, (1875–1968) US botanist
 John Haring (1739–1809), American lawyer and delegate to the Continental Congress
 Keith Haring (1958–1990), American street artist

See also
 Haring Township, Michigan
 Harring (disambiguation)
 Häring (disambiguation)
 Hering (disambiguation)
 Herring (disambiguation)

German-language surnames